Arachniodes tsiangiana is a species of fern in the family Dryopteridaceae. It is endemic to China.  Its natural habitat is subtropical or tropical moist lowland forests. It is threatened by habitat loss.

References

Flora of China
Dryopteridaceae
Endangered plants
Taxonomy articles created by Polbot
Taxa named by Ren-Chang Ching